Ragıp Başdağ (born June 9, 1978 in Trabzon, Turkey) is a Turkish footballer. During the 2002-03 season, Ragip was suspended from football for six months after having failed a doping test. He currently plays for A. Selcukspor in the midfielder position.

Career
Ragıp, is a product of Trabzonspor youth system. Ragip signed with Kayserispor for 4 years. In May 2009, he was released by Kayserispor, and subsequently joined Eskişehirspor for 2 years.

During the 2002-03 season, Ragip was suspended from football for six months after having failed a doping test.

Honours 
 Kayserispor
Turkish Cup (1): 2008

References

External links

1978 births
Living people
Kayserispor footballers
Turkish footballers
Trabzonspor footballers
Sakaryaspor footballers
Akçaabat Sebatspor footballers
Eskişehirspor footballers
Denizlispor footballers
Kayseri Erciyesspor footballers
Süper Lig players
Doping cases in association football
Turkish sportspeople in doping cases
TFF First League players
Balıkesirspor footballers
Association football midfielders